Geraci is an Italian surname.

People
Notable people with the surname include:
Alan Yuri Geraci, Italian drag queen
Anthony Geraci (born 1954), American  blues and jazz musician
Benedetto Geraci (1590–1660), Italian Roman Catholic bishop
Frank Paul Geraci Jr. (born 1951), American judge
Gino Geraci, American pastor and Christian radio talk show host
Michele Geraci (born 1966), Italian economist and politician
Nenè Geraci (1917–2007), Sicilian Mafioso
Peter Francis Geraci, American bankruptcy attorney
Sonny Geraci (1946–2017), American musician and singer
Tommaso Geraci (born 1931), Italian sculptor

Fictional characters
Nick Geraci, the fictional character who kidnaps and murders Tom Hagen in Mark Winegardner's novel, The Godfather's Revenge (2006)
Captain Sidney Geraci, a character in the film Brooklyn's Finest
Steve Geraci, the fictional Sheriff of Iberia Parish, Louisiana, in True Detective (season 1), episode 7
The Geracis, Marvel Comics characters

See also
Geraci (disambiguation)

Italian-language surnames